Ganguwala is a village in the Rajasthan State of India.

Villages in Sri Ganganagar district